Aleksandr Yurievich Domogarov (born 12 July 1963) is a Soviet and Russian theater actor, TV presenter, Russian chanson singer, People's Artist of Russia (2007), actor known for playing historical roles.

Biography 
Was born in Moscow, Russian SFSR, Soviet Union (now Russia). 

In 1984 played in the Russian film Inheritance. He continued to play in the Mossovet Theatre. Since April 2005, Domogarov has been the lead in an open-ended run of Jekyll and Hyde at the Mossovet Theater.

He then returned to Bandit Petersburg but this time playing a different role. In 2005 he starred in the film The One Who Lost the Sun. He also starred in the TV series Woman's Romance. In 2006 he played in the film The Wolfhound.

Awards 
 1997 - Seagull Award for Best Actor 1996-1997 theater season of the year  for his role in the play of Georges Duroy Bel Ami.
 2000 - Honored Artist of Russia 
 2007 - People's Artist of Russia

Personal life 
The first wife Natalia Sagoyan
 Son Dmitry (January 7, 1985 - 7 June 2008), was killed in an accident  
The second wife - Irina Gunenkova 
Son Alexander Domogarov Jr., actor, was born on February 7, 1989 
 Aleksandr Domogarov married actress Natalia Gromushkina in 2001 but was divorced from her in 2005.

Filmography
Aleksandr Domogarov has starred in over 92 films

References

External links
 
 Official website
 Официальная группа на www.facebook.com

Soviet male actors
1963 births
Living people
Russian male film actors
Russian male television actors
Russian male stage actors
People's Artists of Russia
Honored Artists of the Russian Federation
20th-century Russian male actors
21st-century Russian male actors
Russian television presenters
20th-century Russian male singers
20th-century Russian singers
21st-century Russian male singers
21st-century Russian singers